The BT/AT 52 is a rifle grenade manufactured by Israeli Military Industries. It is propelled by a bullet trap, and is derived from the earlier MA/AT 52 model. In Israeli service it can be fired from either the 7.62 FN FAL or the 5.56 Galil rifle.

Sources and references

External links
An IDF paratrooper with AT52 rifle grenade in Jerusalem during the Six Day War.
IDF soldier armed with FAL rifle and AT52 rifle grenades
IDF patrol in Lebanon, soldier in foreground is armed with a Galil and an AT52 rifle grenade
An AT52 rifle grenade mounted on the muzzle of a Galil
Article (in Spanish) with reference to Israeli rifle grenades

Rifle grenades
Anti-tank grenades
Infantry weapons of the Cold War
Israeli brands
Israeli inventions
Weapons of Israel